Dana Davis (born October 4, 1978) is an American actress, voice actress, and novelist known for playing Monica Dawson on the NBC series Heroes (2007), Chastity Church on the ABC Family television series 10 Things I Hate About You (2009–10) and Carmen Phillips on the TNT series Franklin & Bash (2011–2013). She is an accomplished voice actress whose credits include Star vs. the Forces of Evil, She-Ra and the Princesses of Power,
and the role of Kit on Craig of the Creek.

Biography
Davis was born in Davenport, Iowa, and attended North High School. She is a trained violinist and attended Loyola Marymount University where she earned her bachelor's degree in Music in 2006.

Davis appeared alongside teen actress Hilary Duff in Raise Your Voice. She has also appeared in Veronica Mars, That's So Raven, The O.C., Gilmore Girls, Point Pleasant, Pushing Daisies, and Hidden Palms.

In July 2007, The Hollywood Reporter announced that Davis would be joining the second season of the TV series Heroes, as Monica Dawson, who was described as a "young hero" willing to "give up everything to help the people around her". The character is the niece of D.L. Hawkins and first cousin of Micah Sanders. She has the power of muscle mimicry, meaning she can master instantly any physical skill she witnesses.

Davis played the role of Peyton in the hit film Coach Carter (2005) alongside Ashanti. She also starred as Lisa Hines in Prom Night (2008). Davis played Chastity Church in the ABC Family series 10 Things I Hate About You (Gabrielle Union played the character in the film) appearing in all 20 episodes. According to series creator Carter Covington, Davis asked out of her contract after the 20 episodes to explore new career opportunities, so Chastity was written out as transferring to a new school; the show was cancelled shortly after the episode aired.

Books

Davis uses "Dana L. Davis" as her pen name, while retaining "Dana Davis" for her acting roles. She is the author of Tiffany Sly Lives Here Now, a contemporary young adult novel published by Harlequin Books in April 2018.

Her second novel, The Voice In My Head, was published by HarperCollins and released on May 28, 2019.

Her third novel, Roman and Jewell, was published by Inkyard Press and released in January 2021.

Davis's fourth novel, Someone You Used to Know, was released on October 18, 2022 by Skyscape Publishing.

Filmography

Film

Television

Music videos

References

External links

 

1978 births
Living people
Actors from Davenport, Iowa
Actresses from Iowa
African-American actresses
American film actresses
American television actresses
American violinists
Loyola Marymount University alumni
21st-century American actresses
21st-century violinists
African-American women musicians
21st-century African-American women
21st-century African-American people
20th-century African-American people
20th-century African-American women
African-American novelists